Luis Cabral (born 23 September 1983) is a Paraguayan international footballer, who plays for Guaraní as a defender.

Career
Cabral has played for Guaraní, Fernando de la Mora and Sol de América.

He made his international debut for Paraguay in 2010.

References

1983 births
Living people
Paraguayan footballers
Paraguay international footballers
Association football defenders